Abdul Mannan is an Indian politician who was the  Leader of the Opposition belonging to Indian National Congress in the West Bengal Legislative Assembly.

On 7 February 2017, Mannan was seriously injured in a fight over a property damage bill in the Assembly. Mannan protested the law, which would jail criminals for vandalism for 7 years, using placards. He was asked to stop but refused, after which he was suspended. He then sat in the Well of the House in protest, which led to a confrontation between police trying to remove him and fellow Congress MLAs, leading to Mannan being seriously injured.

Two days later, Mannan complained of suffocation and chest pains during an Assembly meeting, leading him to get a temporary pacemaker implanted another two days later.

Mannan was defeated by TMC candidate Arindam Guin in the 2021 Legislative Assembly election.

References

Living people
Members of the West Bengal Legislative Assembly
Indian National Congress politicians
1952 births